may refer to:

 Austrian identity card
 German identity card